Connecticut's 128th House of Representatives district elects one member of the Connecticut House of Representatives. It encompasses parts of Bridgeport and has been represented by Democrat Christopher Rosario since 2015.

List of representatives

Recent elections

2020

2018

2016

2014

2012

References

128